Naso fageni is a tropical fish found in the west Pacific and Indian Oceans. It is known commonly as the horseface unicornfish or the horseface unicorn. It is of value in commercial fisheries.

References

Naso (fish)
Fish described in 1954